Salas is a nearly extinct language of Seram, Indonesia.

External links

Central Maluku languages
Languages of Indonesia
Seram Island
Endangered Austronesian languages